Area 6 may refer to:

Area 6 (NTS) one of the test areas on the Nevada National Security Site
Area 6, the sixth level and defense outpost of planet Venom in the video game Star Fox 64/Lylat Wars
Brodmann area 6